European Automotive Design was a British magazine, which was closed in January 2009 because the publishing company behind it—Findlay Publications Ltd—was taken into administration by its major shareholder, Robert Findlay. When he re-invented the company as Findlay Media Ltd, he 'left behind' European Automotive Design and its sister publications (European Truck & Bus Technology and Automotive Design Asia) along with its founding editor and publisher.

References

Automobile magazines published in the United Kingdom
Magazines with year of establishment missing
Magazines disestablished in 2009
Automotive design
Design magazines
Defunct magazines published in the United Kingdom